The Eastern Bengal Railway (full name: "Eastern Bengal Railway Company"; shortened EBR) was one of the pioneering railway companies that operated from 1857 to 1942, in Bengal and Assam provinces of British India.

History

Formation
The Eastern Bengal Railway Company was incorporated by the Eastern Bengal Railway Act 1857 (20 & 21 Vict. c.159) of the Parliament of the United Kingdom, with the objective of introduction of railway transport in eastern Bengal and even to move into Burma. The operational area of Eastern Bengal Railway was to be the east bank of the Hooghly River, while East Indian Railway Company operated on the west bank of the river.

Rolling stock
By the end of 1877 the company owned 43 steam locomotives, 180 coaches and 691 goods wagons. By 1936, the rolling stock had increased to 327 locomotives, 3 steam railcars, 1560 coaches and 13.781 freight wagons.

Classification
It was labeled as a Class I railway according to Indian Railway Classification System of 1926.

Subsequent developments
The EBR was taken over by the Government of India in 1884 and renamed the Eastern Bengal State Railway. The Calcutta and South Eastern Railway was merged into it in 1887. In 1915, it reverted to its old name Eastern Bengal Railway. In 1941, the Bengal Dooars Railway was merged into Eastern Bengal Railway. In 1942, the Government of India merged Assam Bengal Railway with Eastern Bengal Railway to create Bengal and Assam Railway.

Successors
After the partition of India in 1947 the broad-gauge portion of the Bengal and Assam Railway, lying in India was added to the East Indian Railway and the metre-gauge portion became the Assam Railway.

On 14 April 1952, Assam Railway and the Oudh and Tirhut Railway were amalgamated to form the North Eastern Railway. On the same day, the reorganized Sealdah division of the erstwhile Bengal Assam Railway (which was added to the East Indian Railway earlier) was amalgamated with the Eastern Railway.

With the formation of the Northeast Frontier Railway on 15 January 1958, the portions of the erstwhile Eastern Bengal Railway that were in Assam and the Indian portion of  North Bengal, came under its jurisdiction.

The portion of the system which fell within the boundary of erstwhile East Pakistan was named as Eastern Bengal Railway. On 1 February 1961, Eastern Bengal Railway was renamed as Pakistan Railway and in 1962 it became Pakistan Eastern Railway. With the emergence of Bangladesh, it became Bangladesh Railway.

Lines

The first line of Eastern Bengal Railway was from Calcutta to Kushtia in 1862 (presently covered by Sealdah–Ranaghat line, Ranaghat–Gede line and Chilahati–Parbatipur–Santahar–Darshana line). It was decided in 1865 to extend the line to Goalundo Ghat. The extension opened on 31 December 1870. By 1902, it was extended north to as far as Dhubri in Assam.

The Eastern Bengal Railway, which operated east of the Hooghly, was linked with the East Indian Railway, which operated west of the river, when Jubilee Bridge, linking Bandel and Naihati, was opened in 1887. The Calcutta Chord Railway constructed the line from Dum Dum to Dankuni over the Willingdon Bridge in 1932. The bridge was later renamed Vivekananda Setu.

Hindrance to free flow of water
In many parts of riverine eastern Bengal, with long stretches of low lands, the railways had to be built on embankments which hindered the free flow of water. In a brief case study of Eastern Bengal Railway it has been revealed that the water regime of the Rajshahi Division of present Bangladesh was destabilized by the way railway exposed itself to the Chalan Beel. From the beginning of the twentieth century the beel (pond or wetland) began to be bounded by the Calcutta–Siliguri main line on the west and by the Santahar–Bogra line on the north. These lines affected feeding of the beel. Its drainage was affected by the Sirajganj branch line in the south-east.

Conversion to broad gauge 

The Indian part of EBR was converted to  broad gauge in 1990s to 2010s. The Bangladesh part is under conversion to  broad gauge.

References

Defunct railway companies of India
Defunct railway companies of Bangladesh
Rail transport in Assam
History of rail transport in West Bengal
Bengal Presidency
Indian companies established in 1857
Railway companies established in 1857